Father Fernand Lindsay, CM, CQ (often known simply as Father Lindsay) (May 11, 1929 – March 17, 2009) was a Canadian churchman, educator, organist and festival director. He founded the Lanaudière International Music Festival a major classical music festival, and was awarded the Order of Canada and National Order of Quebec, as well as the Calixa-Lavallée and Lescarbot Awards.

References
Obituary  in Le Devoir 
Obituary from the SRC 
Obituary from the CBC
Obituary from La Presse 
Profile on the website of the National Order of Quebec 
"Fernand Lindsay - Bringing Live Classical Greats to Thousands", La Scena Musicale
"Lindsay, Fernand", Encyclopedia of Music in Canada

1929 births
2009 deaths
Canadian organists
Male organists
Canadian educators
Knights of the National Order of Quebec
Members of Christian religious orders
Members of the Order of Canada
Musicians from Quebec
People from Bas-Saint-Laurent
20th-century Canadian male musicians